L. indicus may refer to:
 Laevisuchus indicus, a dinosaur species of the Late Cretaceous
 Lametasaurus indicus, a nomen dubium
 Lethocerus indicus, a giant water bug species native to Southeast Asia
Lutjanus indicus, the striped snapper, a species of marine ray-finned fish

See also
 Indicus (disambiguation)